XML data binding refers to a means of representing information in an XML document as a business object in computer memory. This allows applications to access the data in the XML from the object rather than using the DOM or SAX to retrieve the data from a direct representation of the XML itself.

Description
An XML data binder accomplishes this by automatically creating a mapping between elements of the XML schema of the document we wish to bind and members of a class to be represented in memory.

When this process is applied to convert an XML document to an object, it is called unmarshalling. The reverse process, to serialize an object as XML, is called marshalling.

Approaches to data binding can be distinguished as follows:

 XML schema based: Based on an existing XML schema, classes that correspond to the schema are generated.
 Class based: Based on a set of classes to be serialized, a corresponding XML schema is generated.
 Mapping-based: A mapping description, usually itself an XML document, describes how an existing XML schema maps to a set of classes, and vice versa.

Difficulties

Since XML is inherently sequential and objects are (usually) not, XML data binding mappings often have difficulty preserving all the information in an XML document. Specifically, information like comments, XML entity references, and sibling order may fail to be preserved in the object representation created by the binding application. This is not always the case; sufficiently complex data binders are capable of preserving 100% of the information in an XML document.

Similarly, since objects in computer memory are not inherently sequential, and may include links to other objects (including self-referential links), XML data binding mappings often have difficulty preserving all the information about an object when it is marshalled to XML.

Alternatives

An alternative approach to automatic data binding relies instead on hand-crafted XPath expressions that extract the data from XML. This approach has a number of benefits. First, the data binding code only needs proximate knowledge (e.g., topology, tag names, etc.) of the XML tree structure, which developers can determine by looking at the XML data; XML schemas are no longer mandatory. Furthermore, XPath allows the application to bind the relevant data items and filter out everything else, avoiding the unnecessary processing that would be required to completely unmarshall the entire XML document. The drawback of this approach is the lack of automation in implementing the object model and XPath expressions. Instead the application developers have to create these artifacts manually.

Data binding in general
One of XML data binding's strengths is the ability to un/serialize objects across programs, languages, and platforms.  You can dump a time series of structured objects from a datalogger written in C (programming language) on an embedded processor, bring it across the network to process in Perl and finally visualize in Octave.  The structure and the data remain consistent and coherent throughout the journey, and no custom formats or parsing is required.  This is not unique to XML. YAML, for example, is emerging as a powerful data binding alternative to XML. JSON (which can be regarded as a subset of YAML) is often suitable for lightweight or restricted applications.

XML data binding frameworks

See also
Bound control
Data structure
JSON
LDX+
Serialization
YAML

References

External links
XML Data Binding Resources, by Ronald Bourret
XML Schema Patterns for Databinding Working Group

Programming constructs
XML